This is a list of current and former Roman Catholic churches in Vicariate I of the Roman Catholic Archdiocese of Chicago. Vicariate I covers Lake County, Illinois, and portions of northern Cook County. It includes the communities of Des Plaines, Elk Grove Village, Lake Forest, Mount Prospect, Mundelein, Schaumburg, and Waukegan. The vicariate is further subdivided into six regional areas, Deanery A through Deanery F.

Deanery A: Mundelein area

Deanery B: Waukegan

Deanery C: Lake Forest area

Deanery D: Arlington Heights area

Deanery E: Elk Grove and Schaumburg

Deanery F: Des Plaines and Mount Prospect

See also
 List of churches in the Roman Catholic Archdiocese of Chicago

References

Chicago